City Centre Offices is a record label based in Manchester, England, with an affiliate in Berlin, Germany. The label, founded in 1998 by Shlom Sviri and De:Bug magazine writer Thaddeus Herrmann, has released music from several notable acts, including Arovane, Boy Robot, Marsen Jules, Christian Kleine, Casino Versus Japan, Ulrich Schnauss, The Gentleman Losers and I'm Not a Gun.

See also
 List of record labels

References

 Junkmedia interview with Herrmann
 Involve Records interview with Herrmann
 Stylus Magazine Label Spotlight: City Centre Offices

External links
 
 City Centre Offices label information from Discogs

British record labels
German record labels
Record labels established in 1998
Electronic music record labels
Companies based in Manchester